Marie Louise "Mia" De Vits (born 31 March 1950) is a Belgian politician.

De Vits started her career with the socialist trade union ABVV in 1973, rising through the ranks to become Secretary-General (1989–2002) and its chairman (2002–2004).

In 2004 De Vits went into elective politics and was elected a Member of the European Parliament (2004–2009) with the Socialistische Partij-Anders, part of the Socialist Group. She sat on the European Parliament's Committee on the Internal Market and Consumer Protection. She was a substitute for the Committee on Economic and Monetary Affairs.

In 2009 she was elected to the Flemish Parliament and served from 2009 to 2014. She retired from politics after the 2014 regional elections.

Education
 1971: Degree in social sciences

Career
 1971–1973: Freelance journalist with VRT-TV (Flemish Radio and Television Company)
 1973–1984: Policy adviser, General Federation of Belgian Labour (ABVV/FGTB)
 1984–1989: Federal Secretary, ABVV
 1989–2002: Secretary-General, ABVV
 2002–2004: Chairwoman of the ABVV
 1989–2004: Member of the executive board of the International Confederation of Free Trade Unions
 1989–2004: Member of the executive committee, European Trade Union Confederation
 Member of the Governing Body of the International Labour Organization, Geneva
 2004–2009: Member of the European Parliament
 2009–2014: Member of the Flemish Parliament

See also
 2004 European Parliament election in Belgium

External links
 Personal Website
 
 

1950 births
Living people
Belgian trade unionists
Socialistische Partij Anders MEPs
MEPs for Belgium 2004–2009
MEPs for Belgium 2009–2014
21st-century women MEPs for Belgium
Members of the Flemish Parliament